

Burgess may refer to:

People and fictional characters
 Burgess (surname), a list of people and fictional characters
 Burgess (given name), a list of people

Places
Burgess, Michigan, an unincorporated community
Burgess, Missouri, United States
Burgess, South Carolina, United States
Burgess, Virginia, United States
Burgess Township, Bond County, Illinois, United States
Burgess Park, London, England
Burgess Field Oxford, England
Burgess Hill, Sussex, England
Mount Burgess, Canadian Rockies
Burgess Branch, a tributary of Missisquoi River, Vermont, United States

Other uses
Burgess (title), a political official or representative
Burgess Company, an American airplane manufacturer
Burgess GAA, an athletic club in Ireland

See also
Burgess House (disambiguation), several buildings named
Burgess model, or Concentric zone model, a theoretical model in urban geography
Burgess reagent, used in organic chemistry
Burgess Shale, a fossil-bearing formation near Mount Burgess in Canada
Church Burgesses, an English charitable organisation
House of Burgesses, Virginia, U.S.
The Royal Burgess Golfing Society of Edinburgh